Hervé is a French masculine given name of Breton origin, from the name of the 6th-century Breton  Saint Hervé. The common latinization of the name is Herveus (also Haerveus), an early (8th-century) latinization  was Charivius. Anglicized forms are  Harvey and  Hervey. 

Its Old Breton form was Huiarnviu (cf. Old Welsh Haarnbiu ), composed of the elements hoiarn ("iron", modern Breton houarn, c.f. Welsh haearn) and viu ("bright", "blazing", modern Breton bev). Its common Celtic form would have been  *isarno-biuos or *-ue(s)uos.  
Recorded Middle Breton forms of the name include Ehuarn, Ehouarn, Houarn.
The name of the 6th-century saint is recorded in numerous variants, including forms such as:
Houarniault, Houarneau; as the name of a legendary Breton bard, the name occurs in varians such as Hyvarnion, Huaruoé, Hoarvian.

People with the given name
medieval
Saint Hervé, 6th-century Breton saint
Saint-Hervé, French commune
Saint-M'Hervé, French commune
Charivius, Duke of Maine (fl. 723)
Hervé (Norman) (fl. 1050s), Byzantine general of Norman extraction
Hervey le Breton (died 1131), Bishop of Bangor and later Bishop of Ely
Hervé IV of Donzy (1173–1223), French nobleman
Harvey I of Léon, Breton viscount
Hervé de Bourg-Dieu (c. 1080–1150), Benedictine monk
Hervaeus Natalis (1260–1323), French Dominican theologian

modern
Hervé Alicarte, French footballer
Hervé Arsène, French-Malagasy footballer
Hervé Balland, French cross-country skier
Hervé Bazin, French writer
Hervé Biausser, French university director
Hervé Bochud, Swiss footballer
Hervé Bohbot, French Scrabble player
Hervé Bugnet, French footballer
Hervé Carré, French economist
Hervé Cuillandre, French writer
Hervé de Charette, French politician
Hervé de Luze, French film director
Hervé Di Rosa, French painter
Hervé Déry, Canadian librarian and archivist 
Hervé Duclos-Lassalle, French cyclist
Hervé Faye, French astronomer (1814 – 1902)
Hervé Filion, Canadian harness racer
Hervé Gauthier, French footballer and coach
Hervé Gaymard, French politician
Hervé Guibert, French writer
Hervé Guilleux, French motorcycle racer
Hervé Guy, Ivorian footballer
Hervé Kage, Belgian footballer
Hervé Kambou, Ivorian footballer
Hervé Lacelles, Canadian boxer
Hervé Lamizana, Ivory Coast football player
Hervé Le Bras (born 1943), French demographer, historian and mathematician.
Hervé Le Tellier, French writer
Hervé Makuka, Swiss footballer
Hervé Morin, French politician
Hervé Ndjana Onana, Cameroonian footballer
Hervé Novelli, French politician
Hervé Nzelo-Lembi, Congolese footballer
Hervé Otélé, French-Cameroonian footballer
Hervé Paillet, French actor
Hervé Piccirillo, French football referee
Hervé Renard, French football manager
Hervé Revelli, French footballer
Hervé Riel, French fisherman
Hervé This, French chemist
Hervé Tum, Cameroonian footballer
Hervé Vilard (born 1946), French singer
Hervé Villechaize (1943–1993), French-American actor
J. Hervé Proulx, Canadian politician

pseudonym
Hervé (1825–1892), stage name of French operetta composer, singer, librettist and conductor, born Florimond Ronger
Hervé (DJ), DJ and producer in the UK

As a surname
Baron Hervey
Thomas Hervey (landowner) (d. 1694), son of Sir William Hervey (1585–1660) 
John Hervey, 1st Earl of Bristol
John Hervey, 2nd Baron Hervey
Augustus Hervey, 3rd Earl of Bristol
Frederick Hervey, 4th Earl of Bristol

modern French surname
Antoine Hervé, French composer
Cédric Hervé, French cyclist
Edmond Hervé, French politician
Francis Hervé, French-British artist  (1781–1850) 
Francisco Hervé, Chilean geologist
Gustave Hervé, French politician (1871 – 1944)
Pascal Hervé, French cyclist

pseudonym
Lucien Hervé, French-Hungarian photographer, born László Elkán.

References

French masculine given names
Breton-language surnames
Surnames from given names